Pete Gage may refer to:

Pete Gage (guitarist) (born 1947),  English guitarist and producer noted for his work with Geno Washington, Vinegar Joe and Elkie Brooks
Pete Gage (singer) (born 1946), English vocalist noted for his work with Jet Harris and Dr. Feelgood